The Territorial Abbacy (or Abbey) of Claraval was a Cistercian (Latin Catholic Benedictine rule-order) prelature in Brazil.

History 
Established on 1968.05.11 as Territorial Abbacy of Claraval (Portuguese for Clairvaux) on territory -including Claraval- in the southwest of the state Minas Gerais, canonically split off from the Roman Catholic Diocese of Guaxupé.

Suppressed on 2002.12.11, its territory being merged back into the above Diocese of Guaxupé.

Ordinaries 
Abbot Ordinaries of Claraval 
(all Roman Rite)

 Pedro José Agostini, Cistercian Order (O. Cist.) (1969.07.12 – death 1973), born 1904.04.12 in Italy
 Carmelo Domênico Recchia, O. Cist. (1976.12.07 – 1999.03.24), born 1921.12.14 in Italy
 Apostolic Administrator Orani João Tempesta, O. Cist. (1999.03.24 – 2002.12.11), only Brazilian Ordinary, while Bishop of Rio Preto (Brazil) (1997.02.26 – 2002.12.11); later Bishop of São José do Rio Preto (Brazil) (2002.12.11 – 2004.10.13), Metropolitan Archbishop of Belém do Pará (Brazil) (2004.10.13 – 2009.02.27), Metropolitan Archbishop of São Sebastião do Rio de Janeiro (Brazil) (2009.02.27 – ...), created Cardinal-Priest of S. Maria Madre della Provvidenza a Monte Verde (2014.02.22 [2014.04.12] – ...)

External links and sources 
 GCatholic, with Google satellite photo

Territorial abbeys
Former Roman Catholic dioceses in America